Sun 969 is Alice Springs only local commercial radio station on the FM frequency.
The station broadcasts from its premises on the Stuart Highway just outside Alice Springs with nightly, syndicated broadcasts from a local pub, Bojangles.

2019 Sun FM Programmes:
 The Big Breakfast with Foxxie - 6:00am – 10:00am
 More Music Workday & Workforce Requests with Nicky G - 10:00am – 12:00pm
 Arvo's with Loz - 12:00pm – 3:00pm 
 Carrie & Tommy - 3:00pm – 4:30pm 
 Hughesy & Kate - 4.30pm - 7:00pm

Weekend Programmes:
 Max Music Weekends - Saturday 10:00am – 2:00pm and Sunday 6:00am – 2:00pm
 Carrie & Tommy Best Bits Of Weekend Specials
 Rick Dees Weekly Top 40 - Saturday from 2:00pm 
 Trending 20 with Angus

Networked Shows
 Hamish and Andy's Happy Hour (3.00pm - 4.00pm weekdays)
 The Dan & Maz Show (4.00pm - 6.00pm)
 The Hot Hits Live from LA
 Fitzy and Wippa
 Take 40 Australia
 Rick Dees Weekly Top 40

References

Contemporary hit radio stations in Australia
Radio stations in the Northern Territory
Radio stations in Alice Springs